Adjuntas barrio-pueblo is a barrio and the administrative center (seat) of Adjuntas, a municipality of Puerto Rico. Its population in 2010 was 4,406.

As was customary in Spain, in Puerto Rico, the municipality has a barrio called pueblo which contains a central plaza, the municipal buildings (city hall), and a Catholic church. Fiestas patronales (patron saint festival) are held in the central plaza every year.

The central plaza and its church
The central plaza, or square, is a place for official and unofficial recreational events and a place where people can gather and socialize from dusk to dawn. The Laws of the Indies, Spanish law, which regulated life in Puerto Rico in the early 19th century, stated the plaza's purpose was for "the parties" (celebrations, festivities), and that the square should be proportionally large enough for the number of neighbors. These Spanish regulations also stated that the streets nearby should be comfortable portals for passersby, protecting them from the elements: sun and rain.

History
The location of modern-day Adjuntas barrio-pueblo was first settled in the Cidra River valley at the beginning of the 19th century, along an old road that connected Utuado with Ponce and the southern coast of Puerto Rico. At the time, the territory formed part of the municipal region of Coamo. A chapel was erected in 1805, which was later upgraded into a parish church by petition of the citizens of Adjuntas. The official founding of the pueblo happened on August 11, 1815, with Don Diego Maldonado being its official founder and first elected representative. The settlement of Adjuntas was granted official "villa" status by the Spanish crown in 1894.

Puerto Rico was ceded by Spain in the aftermath of the Spanish–American War under the terms of the Treaty of Paris of 1898 and became an unincorporated territory of the United States. In 1899, the United States Department of War conducted a census of Puerto Rico finding that the population of Adjuntas barrio-pueblo (Pueblo) was 1,963.

Landmarks and places of interest 

 The Adjuntas Public Square (Plaza Pública de Adjuntas), located at the very center of town, is one of the highest in Puerto Rico, at almost 1,640 feet (500 m) in elevation. It hosts a large working thermometer, paying homage to some of the coldest recorded temperatures in Puerto Rico. As it is custom in Puerto Rico, the plaza also hosts the city hall (alcaldía) and Roman Catholic parish church (Parroquia San Joaquín).
 Casa Pueblo (Spanish for "the people's house") is a non-profit community and educational organization dedicated to the protection of the environment. It is located in a historic Criollo house, and it often hosts cultural events, educational tours and classes. This organization is largely responsible for the creation of the nearby People's Forest (Bosque del Pueblo).
 The Washington Irving Grade School (Escuela Graduada Washington Irving) is a National Register of Historic Places-listed building located near the town plaza.

Gallery 
Places in Adjuntas barrio-pueblo:

See also

 List of communities in Puerto Rico

References

External links

Barrios of Adjuntas, Puerto Rico